Karin Åström (born 1953) is a Swedish politician, who served three terms as a member of the Riksdag for the Social Democratic Party from 2004 to 2014, representing Norrbotten County. She served as President of the Nordic Council in 2014.

Member of Parliament

As a member of the Riksdag, she served as a member of the Committee on the Constitution. In 2013 she announced the she would not seek reelection in 2014.

President of the Nordic Council

In 2013 she was elected President of the Nordic Council for the year 2014. As President of the Nordic Council, she criticized the Russian decision to hold a referendum in Crimea on accession as illegitimate and unacceptable.
She is a native of Överkalix.

References 

1953 births
Living people
Members of the Riksdag from the Social Democrats
Women members of the Riksdag
Members of the Riksdag 2002–2006
Members of the Riksdag 2006–2010
Members of the Riksdag 2010–2014
21st-century Swedish women politicians